Dover is a toponymic surname of Celtic origin used in English and German names.

English surname etymology
Relating to the port of Dover in Kent, England. Named from the river on which it stands, Dover is a Celtic name meaning "the waters" (from the word that later became the modern Welsh word "dwfr" for "water").

German surname etymology
Relating to Doveren, a part of the town Hückelhoven in the Rhineland of uncertain etymology. Its origin is possibly also Celtic and thereby related in meaning to the English name as well.

People with the surname Dover

 Cedric Dover (1904–1961), British-Indian entomologist, poet, and writer
 Connie Dover, American singer/songwriter
 Den Dover (born 1938), British politician
 Eric Dover (born 1967), American musician
 Gabriel Dover (1937–2018), British geneticist
 Kenneth Dover (1920–2010), British academic; former Chancellor of the University of St Andrews
 Kieran Dover (born 1996), Australian footballer
 Mary Dover (fl. 1908), Canadian chemist
 Mildred Dover (born 1941), former Canadian politician
 Robert Dover (Cotswold Games) (1575–1641), English captain and attorney
 Robert Dover (equestrian) (born 1958), American Olympic equestrian
 Rupert Dover, Hong Kong police officer
equestrian
 Jonathan Dover (born 1964), a lawyer in Manchester from Liverpool

References

Surnames
English-language surnames
Celtic-language surnames
Toponymic surnames